"The Hidden Tiger" is the eighth episode of the fifth series of the 1960s cult British spy-fi television series The Avengers, starring Patrick Macnee and Diana Rigg, and guest starring Ronnie Barker, Lyndon Brook, Gabrielle Drake, and John Phillips. It was first broadcast in the Southern and Tyne Tees regions of the ITV network on Wednesday 1 March 1967. ABC Weekend Television, who commissioned the show for ITV, broadcast it in its own regions three days later on Saturday 4 March. The episode was directed by Sidney Hayers, and written by Philip Levene.

Cast
Patrick Macnee as John Steed
Diana Rigg as Emma Peel
Ronnie Barker as Cheshire
Lyndon Brook as Dr. Manx
Gabrielle Drake as Angora
John Phillips as Nesbit
Michael Forrest as Peters
Stanley Meadows as Erskine
Jack Gwillim as Sir David Harper
Frederick Treves as Dawson
Brian Haines as Samuel Jones
John Moore as Williams
Reg Pritchard as Bellamy

References

External links

Episode overview on The Avengers Forever! website

The Avengers (season 5) episodes